The Journal of Dermatology is a peer-reviewed medical journal covering dermatology published by the Japanese Dermatological Association (日本皮膚科学会 Nihon Hifuka Gakkai) and the Asian Dermatological Association. Its 2014 impact factor is 2.252.

References

External links
home page of Journal of Dermatology
Home page 

Dermatology journals
Publications established in 1974
Monthly journals
English-language journals
Periodicals published in Japan